Dog Food is an EP by Mondo Generator released on May 25, 2010.  It features a cover of Iggy Pop's classic "Dog Food". The song features Dave Grohl, Happy-Tom (Turbonegro) and Marc Diamond (The Dwarves). It also contains 2 acoustic studio songs and 5 live songs from Nick Oliveri's Death Acoustic tour in 2010.

Track listing
 "Dog Food" - 2:28 (Iggy Pop)
 "Smashed Apart" - 2:49 (Nick Oliveri)
 "This Isn't Love" - 2:50 (Nick Oliveri)
 "Green Machine" (Live) - 3:40 (Brant Bjork)
 "Endless Vacation" (Live) - 1:34 (Dee Dee Ramone/Johnny Ramone)
 "Bloody Hammer" (Live) - 3:05 (Roky Erickson)
 "Dungaree High" (Live) - 2:58 (Turbonegro)
 "Pushed Aside" (Live) - 0:59 (Trash Talk)

Personnel
Nick Oliveri – Vocals, Acoustic Guitar
Dave Grohl - Drums

Tracks 2-8 Recorded in Australia at Main Street Studios in 2010
Nick Oliveri - Vocals, Acoustic Guitar, Electric Guitar

Technical Staff
Adam Jordan - Engineer & Mixing

References

Mondo Generator albums
2010 EPs
Impedance Records albums